Shoreditch was a parliamentary constituency centred on the Shoreditch district of the East End of London.  It returned one Member of Parliament (MP) to the House of Commons of the Parliament of the United Kingdom, elected by the first-past-the-post voting system.

The constituency was created for the 1918 general election, and abolished for the 1950 general election, when it was partly replaced by the new Shoreditch and Finsbury constituency.

Boundaries 
Throughout its existence, the constituency's boundaries were contiguous with those of the Metropolitan Borough of Shoreditch.

Members of Parliament

Election results

Election in the 1910s

Election in the 1920s

Election in the 1930s

Election in the 1940s
General Election 1939–40

Another General Election was required to take place before the end of 1940. The political parties had been making preparations for an election to take place and by the Autumn of 1939, the following candidates had been selected; 
Labour: Ernest Thurtle
Liberal National: James Houseman
British Union: Michael Goulding

References

Parliamentary constituencies in London (historic)
Constituencies of the Parliament of the United Kingdom established in 1918
Constituencies of the Parliament of the United Kingdom disestablished in 1950
Parliamentary constituencies in the London Borough of Hackney
Shoreditch